The  Liga Boliviana de Básquet (abbreviated as Libobasket) is the top professional basketball league in Bolivia that was founded in 2013. It replaced the Liga Superior de Baloncesto de Bolivia (2007–2012) and División Mayor de Baloncesto Boliviano (1994–2006) as the top-tier basketball league in the country.

Championships

Current clubs

Individual awards

Season MVP

Finals MVP

References

External links
Presentation at Latinasket.com
Presentation at facebook.com

Videos
Libobasquet: CAN 104 - 85 Carl A-Z, La Salle Tarija 58 - 64 San Simon - Youtube.com video 

Basketball competitions in Bolivia
Bol